Ross Kelvin Burden (16 December 1968 – 17 July 2014) was a celebrity chef from New Zealand. His early career was as a model and he became a chef later in life inspired by the  time spent cooking with his grandmother.

Career
Burden's professional television career began after he reached the final of the BBC series MasterChef 1993. He frequently appeared on Ready Steady Cook for at least eight years, filmed a healthy-eating video with Joan Collins, and made at least five series for Taste.

Burden published at least two books and wrote columns for two magazines. In May 2006, he appeared on The X Factor: Battle of the Stars along with fellow chefs Jean-Christophe Novelli, Aldo Zilli and Paul Rankin. In 2010, Burden judged the first season of MasterChef New Zealand with Simon Gault and Ray McVinnie.

Personal life and death
Burden was born in Napier, New Zealand, and brought up in Hawke's Bay, New Zealand. A self-taught cook, Burden hosted and was a guest on programmes across the world. He was once voted one of the UK's most eligible bachelors. He was gay.

Burden died in Auckland on 17 July 2014 of an infection relating to treatment for leukaemia. In November 2014, it was revealed Burden had died of Legionnaires' disease due to the infected water supply in the hospital.

References

1968 births
2014 deaths
British television chefs
Gay entertainers
New Zealand gay writers
New Zealand expatriates in England
People from Napier, New Zealand
The X Factor (British TV series) contestants